Norbury Park is a swathe of mixed wooded and agricultural land associated with its Georgian manor house near Leatherhead and Dorking, Surrey, which appears in the Domesday Book of 1086.  It occupies mostly prominent land reaching into a bend in the Mole in the parish of Mickleham.

The park is Grade II listed on the Register of Historic Parks and Gardens. It is part of the Mole Gap to Reigate Escarpment Special Area of Conservation and a Site of Special Scientific Interest.

History

A small Bronze Age hoard consisting of two palstave axes and a scabbard chape dating from around 1150-1000 BC was discovered in 2003 in woodland on the western side of the park. The park also contains, at Druids Grove marked on Ordnance Survey maps, an important grove of yew trees apocryphally used by Druids for rituals and ceremony. They are some of the oldest trees of Great Britain.
The manor was also known as Northbury for some time.

The estate is not named in Domesday Book, however there are two entries for Mickleham and it is thought that the second of these relates to Norbury Park. In 1086, the land was held by Oswald as mesne lord to the tenant-in-chief, Richard son of Gilbert. It included five ploughlands,  of meadow and rendered £6 per year. The estate was one of several local manors comprising the Honour of Clare that had been created for Richard fitz Gilbert by William I as a reward for his support during the Norman Conquest. Oswald, the lesser tenant, was a 'conforming Saxon', who had held the land during the reign of Edward the Confessor.

The Park was owned for two centuries by the Stydolf family and the diarist John Evelyn records a visit in August 1655 to both Box Hill, Surrey and Norbury Park, which was then owned by Sir Francis Stydolf.  Sir Francis' son Richard, who was created a baronet by Charles II subsequently inherited the estate and on his death it passed to his daughter, who married Thomas Tryon of Leatherhead.  The estate remained in the Tryon family until 1766 when Charles Tryon (father of William Tryon, then Governor of Province of North Carolina) sold the estate to William Locke, a London art critic.  Locke was responsible for the abandonment of the original site of the manor house on the floodplain of the River Mole and the construction of the current house, designed in 1774 by the architect Thomas Sandby.  Locke commissioned the Irish landscape artist George Barrett Sr. to decorate one of the main reception rooms. Locke also invited J. M. W. Turner to the estate to paint; a watercolour entitled Beech Trees at Norbury Park (1797) is held by the National Gallery of Ireland.

Locke died in 1810 and his family left Norbury Park in 1819.  Ebenezer Fuller Maitland, the former MP for Wallingford, purchased the house in around 1822, and later exchanged it for Park Place, Remenham, Berkshire, with Henry Piper Sperling.  Sperling remained at Norbury Park for 24 years and was responsible for developing the gardens around the House, including the building of Weir Bridge over the River Mole, which still stands today and is Grade II* listed.

Norbury Park was purchased by Thomas Grissell in 1850. It was during his ownership that the railway line from Leatherhead to Dorking was built. Grissell insisted that the three viaducts over the River Mole be built with coloured brickwork with decorative cornices and cast-iron parapets. Similarly, the  Mickleham Tunnel was bored through the chalk with no vertical ventilation shafts. When the line opened in 1867, Grissell secured the right to stop on request any train passing through the railway station at Westhumble, a concession that was abolished by the Transport Act 1962. The station was designed by Charles Henry Driver in the Châteauesque style and included steeply pitched roofs with patterned tiles and an ornamental turret topped with a decorative grille and weather vane.

Leopold Salomons purchased Norbury Park in 1890. He is best known for his gift of Box Hill to the nation in 1914, but he also funded the addition of a vestry to St Michael's Chapel in Westhumble. He died on 23 September 1915. The Norbury Park estate appears to have been partly broken up by the executors of Salomons' will. In August 1922 he sold the property to Sir Edward Mountain, the chairman and managing director of the Eagle Star Insurance Company.

At the urging of James Chuter Ede,Surrey County Council bought   of Norbury Park in July 1930, for which the estate's total purchase price was £97,000, to protect the land from development. The council could find only part of the price, and a public appeal for more donations was unsuccessful, so the house was sold privately, while the parkland remained Council property, as it is today.  Chuter Ede said he hoped the acquisition was one of the most pleasant and enduring memorials of his life's work. The parkland is managed on the council's behalf by the Surrey Wildlife Trust. A 2021 study found that, as a result of the trust's ecological management methods, the estate was capturing over 5000 tonnes of carbon per annum, making it "possibly the most carbon-negative land in the UK".

Marie Stopes, the British scientist and writer, lived at Norbury Park House from 1938 to 1958. She had been an active proponent of sexual education and birth control in the early twentieth century; her book Married Love, published in 1918, was the first sexual manual written in language simple enough to be accessible to a wide public. In 1921 she opened the first birth control clinic in London. On her death in 1958 she bequeathed the Park to the Royal Society of Literature, of which she was a member.  The house was subsequently sold to Philip Spencer, an industrialist.

Norbury Blue cheese
Norbury Blue is named after the park. The blue cheese was made at the Dairy at Norbury Park farm until 2018, when production moved to Sherbourne Farm at Albury.

References

See also

Surrey Wildlife Trust
Mole Valley
Grade II* listed buildings in Surrey
Grade II* listed houses
Grade II listed parks and gardens in Surrey